Alama Fi Hyatak (Arabic : علامة في حياتك ), is a studio album by Amr Mostafa, and was released in 2008. This album was a huge success for Amr Mostafa, winning the EMI Ultimate Album of the Year Award in 2008 and selling more than 150 thousand copies outside Egypt to be the best selling album of the year. Amr worked with western music arrangers in all of the album's songs, trying to mix between Mediterranean music culture and Western music culture and introduce a new type of music in Egypt. It contains ten tracks all composed by Amr Mostafa.

Music video

"Awel Ma Oul" was chosen to be the music video for the album and aired on the Mazzika TV music Channel.

Track listing

 "Awel Ma Oul" - أول ما أقول - (First thing to say) (Arranger: TONI & XASQUI & rocket) - 3:18
 "Alama Fi Hyatak" - علامة في حياتك - (A Sign In Your Life) (Arranger: Emre & Ahmed Adel) - 3:55
 "Yaraet" - ياريت - (I Hope) (Arranger: Gergo & Gabor) - 3:26
 "Helemt Beek" - حلمت بيك - (I Dreamed Of You) (Arranger: TONI & XASQUI) - 3:52
 "Yeshhad Alaya" - بشهد عليا - (His Love Witnesses me) (Arranger: Tamas Kelemen) - 3:37
 "Sraht Feek" - سرحت فيك - (I Thought About You) (Arranger: Gergo & Gabor) - 3:07
 "Mansash" - منساش - (I Won't Forget) (Arranger: Emre Onbayrakbar) - 3:37
 "Za'alan Alek" - زعلان عليك - (Sad For You) (Arranger: Tamas Kelemen) - 3:50
 "Ayamna Fen" - أيامنا فين - (Where Are Our Days?) (Arranger: Gergo & Gabor) - 3:26
 "Yeshhad Alayya (remix)" - يشهد عليا - (His Love Witnesses Me (ReMix) (Arranger: Tamas Kelemen) - 4:18

Lyricists 
 Tamer Hussien Wrote (Alama Fi Hyatak, Sraht Feek, Mansash, Za'alan Alek)
 Khaled Tag el Din Wrote (Yeshhad Alayya, Awel Ma Oul, Helemt Beek, Yaraet)
 Ezz El-din Wrote (Ayamna Fen)

References

2008 albums
Amr Mostafa albums